The John Allen House, off Kentucky Route 169 in Woodford County, Kentucky near Keene, was listed on the National Register of Historic Places in 1983.  The listing included two contributing buildings.

It is an early dry stone hall-parlor plan house believed to have been built c.1790 by John Allen, who received a  grant in 1780 in what was then Virginia, due to his father's military service in 1763. John Allen was an American Revolutionary War soldier from Fauquier County, Virginia.

A stone wing added c.1810 includes a Federal-style mantel.

References

National Register of Historic Places in Woodford County, Kentucky
Federal architecture in Kentucky
Houses in Woodford County, Kentucky
Houses on the National Register of Historic Places in Kentucky
Houses completed in 1790
1790 establishments in Virginia
Pre-statehood history of Kentucky